One Jackson Place is a high-rise office building in Jackson, Mississippi, United States. It was designed in the modernist architectural style, and it was completed in 1987. It is the 20th tallest building in Jackson. As of 2015, it is owned by the Hertz Investment Group, chaired by Judah Hertz.

References

Office buildings completed in 1987
Modernist architecture in Mississippi
Skyscraper office buildings in Jackson, Mississippi